The Darülbedayi was an Ottoman imperial theatre established in Istanbul in 1914. Its history was closely linked to that of its director, the actor Muhsin Ertuğrul.

References

1914 establishments in the Ottoman Empire
Theatres in Istanbul
Theatre in the Ottoman Empire
Theatres completed in 1914